In Limbo is a solo acoustic album  by Irish grunge band Paradox's Pete Mac. It was released in February 2009.

Track listing

Credits
Pete Mac – Guitar, vocals, Bass and tambourine
Produced by Pete Mac

External links 
 discogs.com

2009 albums
Paradox (Irish band) albums